Hero Mode, also known as Mayfield's Game in Australia and the United Kingdom, is a 2021 American independent comedy film directed by A.J. Tesler (in his directorial debut) and written by Jeff Carpenter. Produced by Marcy Carpenter, E.J. Kavounas, and Tesler, the film was released in American theaters on June 4, 2021, distributed by Blue Fox Entertainment. followed by video on demand on June 11, 2021. It received mixed reviews from critics.

Plot 
Financially struggling indie video game business owner Kate asks her son Troy (Chris Carpenter) to develop a video game in time for an upcoming gaming convention in order to save the company. Troy is enthusiastic for the job. But the company's disgruntled coders are not, and in addition Rick, the CEO of a rival company looking to buy out the studio in order to gut it and fire everyone'

Production 
While in production the film went under the title of Mayfield's Game. Filming took place in Los Angeles.

Cast 
 Chris Carpenter as Troy Mayfield
 Mira Sorvino as Kate Mayfield 
 Sean Astin as Jimmy
 Indiana Massara as Paige
 Philip Solomon as Nick
 Nelson Franklin as Rick 
 Mary Lynn Rajskub as Larua
 Kimia Behpoornia as Marie
 Bobby Lee as VP Goodson
 Creed Bratton as James 
 Jim O'Heir as James 
 Monte Markham as Lyndon
 Bret Harrison as George
 Al Madrigal as Larry
 Erik Griffin as Mr. Diehl
 Sonja Read (OMGitsfirefoxx) as Announcer 
 Wood Hawker (BeatEmUps) as himself
 Matthew Patrick (MatPat) as himself
 Scott Wozniak (Scott The Woz) as himself

Release and reception 
Before its release the film generated criticism for its perceived unrealistic portrayal of video game development. The film was released in American theaters on June 4, 2021, distributed by Blue Fox Entertainment. It was followed by video on demand releases on June 11, 2021. It opened with $11,843, for a total domestic gross of $21,178.

The film received mixed reviews from critics. On review aggregator Rotten Tomatoes, the film holds an approval rating of 46% based on reviews from 13 critics. Metacritic gave the film a weighted average score of 46 out of 100 based on 5 critics, indicating "mixed or average reviews".

References

External links
 
 

2021 films
American comedy films
Films about video games
Films shot in California
Films shot in Los Angeles
2021 comedy films
2021 directorial debut films
2021 independent films
American independent films
2020s English-language films
2020s American films